Casino railway station is a heritage-listed railway station on the North Coast line in New South Wales, Australia. Opening on 22 September 1930, it serves the town of Casino in the Richmond Valley Shire. It was added to the New South Wales State Heritage Register on 2 April 1999.

History
The original Casino railway station (now named Old Casino railway station) opened on 19 October 1903 when the Murwillumbah line was extended from Lismore, ultimately reaching Grafton in 1905. However, when the North Coast line was extended from Kyogle to the Queensland border, it would not pass through the Old Casino railway station, as that segment of the line would become a branch line to the new mainline. So it was necessary to build a new mainline station to serve Casino. The new Casino railway station opened on 22 September 1930.

The station originally was an island platform. In October 1990, the eastern platform was decommissioned, later being filled in and redeveloped as a coach stop. The Murwillumbah line branches off immediately North of the station, although it has not been used since 2004, the track is still in place and a short distance at Casino is used for occasional shunting movements.

Casino had a locomotive depot with a roundhouse until it closed on 25 July 1986. It reopened in 1996 when it was leased to Northern Rivers Railroad.

Platforms & services
Casino has one platform with a passing loop. Each day the station is served by a northbound XPT service to Brisbane and a southbound service to Sydney. In addition a daily XPT to/from Sydney terminates at Casino.

NSW TrainLink also operate coach services from the station to Tweed Heads, Robina, Surfers Paradise and Brisbane.

Description

The heritage-listed complex includes a type 13 brick station building with brick platform (completed in 1930), brick refreshment rooms (completed 1930) and a standard 1915 design roundhouse (completed 1933). Structures at the station include the water column in locomotive depot yard, steel water tank with column attached, 75' turntable (completed 1933) and timber and steel 'Harmon' coal stage (completed 1956). A fibro elevated signal box (1946) was demolished in 2012.

Heritage listing 
Casino station group is an imposing and significant group of buildings in a major country location. The station building is one of the largest standard buildings and with the adjacent refreshment rooms constructed at the same time form the best surviving later period station groups in the state. The locomotive facilities are of high significance, particularly the timber coal loader, which is the last of several of these unique structures on the rail system.

Casino railway station was listed on the New South Wales State Heritage Register on 2 April 1999 having satisfied the following criteria.

The place possesses uncommon, rare or endangered aspects of the cultural or natural history of New South Wales.

This item is assessed as historically rare. This item is assessed as scientifically rare. This item is assessed as architecturally rare. This item is assessed as socially rare.

References

Attribution

External links

Casino station details Transport for New South Wales

Easy Access railway stations in New South Wales
Northern Rivers
Railway stations in Australia opened in 1915
Regional railway stations in New South Wales
New South Wales State Heritage Register
Casino, New South Wales
Murwillumbah railway line
North Coast railway line, New South Wales